Albizia burkartiana is a species of tree in the family Fabaceae.

Distribution
The tree is endemic to southwestern Brazil.

It is only found in southwestern Paraná state and western Santa Catarina state, in the basin of the Iguazu River and Uruguay River.

References

burkartiana
Endemic flora of Brazil
Flora of Paraná (state)
Flora of Santa Catarina (state)
Trees of Brazil
Vulnerable flora of South America
Taxonomy articles created by Polbot